Grethe Monica Eikild Valen (born 15 September 1970) is a Norwegian racing cyclist. She won the Norwegian National Road Race Championship five times in the 1990s.

She was born in Porsgrunn, and is the sister of Anita Valen. She was married to Svein Inge Valvik.

She competed at the 1992 Summer Olympics, where she placed fifth, and at the 2000 Summer Olympics, where she placed 29th. She won a gold medal at the 1994 UCI Road World Championships.

References

External links
 

1970 births
Living people
Sportspeople from Porsgrunn
Norwegian female cyclists
Olympic cyclists of Norway
Cyclists at the 1992 Summer Olympics
Cyclists at the 2000 Summer Olympics
UCI Road World Champions (women)
20th-century Norwegian women